Callicerini, or Calliceratini, is a tribe of hoverflies.

List of genera 
Callicera Panzer, 1809
Notiocheilosia Thompson, 1972

References 

Eristalinae
Brachycera tribes